Tobias Whale is a supervillain appearing in American comic books published by DC Comics. He is the archenemy of Black Lightning.

Whale appears in the live-action Arrowverse series Black Lightning, portrayed by Marvin "Krondon" Jones III.

Publication history
Created by Tony Isabella and Trevor Von Eeden, the character made his first appearance in Black Lightning #1 (April 1977).

Fictional character biography

Tobias Whale is an African American kingpin with albinism, who works his way up from the rackets to head the Metropolis branch of the 100. A school teacher named Jefferson Pierce speaks out against the 100's drug trafficking, and, as a response, they make an example of one of his students: Earl Clifford. Joey Toledo leads his men into attacking Earl and hits him with a car. Seeking to avenge the murdered student and receiving help from his tailor friend Peter Gambi, Pierce becomes Black Lightning and attacks Joey and his men. After defeating his henchmen, Joey Toledo is grabbed by Black Lightning, who arranges for Toledo to meet him at Garfield High School's gymnasium to inform on the 100 to him.

When Black Lightning meets with Joey Toledo, Malcolm Merlyn the Dark Archer also appears after being hired by Toledo to kill Black Lightning. Their fight is crashed by Talia al Ghul and the League of Assassins, who are after Merlyn since he left the group after failing to kill Batman. The resulting battle ended with Joey Toledo being killed by a League of Assassins operative. Afterwards, Pierce is so successful in avenging Earl's death that Tobias Whale is sent to jail.

When he breaks out of prison some months later, he teams up with Syonide II in order to distribute a new highly addictive drug. The drug's formula was supposedly in the possession of a woman named Violet Harper. Tobias sends Syonide to retrieve the formula. Unable to gain any information or find any trace of the formula, Syonide kills Harper. Violet Harper later comes back to life when an Aurakle possesses her lifeless body; this new being called herself Halo. Once he learned of Harper's resurrection, Tobias assumed that she must have memorized the formula. But since Harper had no memories from before her death, a frustrated Syonide killed her parents during the Outsiders' fight with Tobias Whale's henchmen.

Often called "the Great White Whale" behind his back, Tobias Whale weighs close to 400 lbs. However, most of his considerable bulk is muscle.

It is unknown whether Tobias Whale ever was associated with the 100's successor group, the 1000.

Whale returned in the miniseries Gotham Underground and has moved to Gotham City, where he is attempting to become the Capo di tutti capi boss of bosses, following the death of Black Mask I. After taking over both the Galante and Odessa crime families, he ends up in a gang war with Intergang. They buy him out and make him the CEO of Kord Enterprises which has become a front for Intergang's criminal activities.

In September 2011, The New 52 rebooted DC's continuity. In this new timeline, Tobias Whale is re-introduced when he gets word that a drug deal done by his representatives was disrupted by both Black Lightning and Blue Devil. He decides to have them hunted down in order to get revenge on them.

In DC Rebirth, the real Tobias Whale was seen in the pages of Black Lightning: Cold Dead Hands. This version was not an albino and the Tobias Whale that encountered Black Lightning and Blue Devil was his unnamed nephew who used his identity during his reign in the Los Angeles criminal underworld. Tobias respected his nephew enough as a blood relative to kill him personally. Tobias later told his unnamed sister that her son was dead for using his name for his "half-assed" ventures and that he was an idiot.

Powers and abilities
Tobias Whale does not possess any superhuman abilities but has strength and muscular prowess far exceeding that of a normal human being. He has fought Black Lightning on several occasions with nothing but his bare hands. Whale is a master hand-to-hand combatant who is skilled in boxing, street fighting and judo. Combined with his great physical strength, this makes him a highly dangerous foe for Black Lightning and several other heroes in the DC Universe like Batman and Booster Gold. Tobias Whale is a highly intelligent criminal strategist who is a skilled planner and mastermind. Whale has vast knowledge of criminal strategies and planning and possesses vast knowledge in political science. Even though Whale is a formidable physical opponent, it is his strategic mind and wealth that makes him a true force to be reckoned with.

Whale has access to a variety of weapons, but his personal favorite weapon is his harpoon which he is dangerously skilled with.

Other versions

Convergence
During the 2015 Convergence storyline, the Pre-Zero-Hour version of Tobias Whale has been trapped in his Metropolis for a full year. He has taken over the criminal underground. He struggles to gain influence over the mysterious food deliveries, as this is something the city values. Tobias Whale is opposed by the vigilante Jean-Paul Valley and the stranded playboy Bruce Wayne. Whale is unaware that Wayne is secretly Batman.

In other media

Television
 Characters based on Tobias Whale appear in series set in the DC Animated Universe:
 Edgar Mandragora, a character partially inspired by and resembling Whale, appears in the Batman Beyond episode "Mind Games", voiced by John Rhys-Davies. He is a telepathic and telekinetic metahuman and member of the Brain Trust, a secret society of psychic metahumans who secretly kidnap children with similar gifts, claiming to the parents that they will help them. When Batman discovers their operations during the events of "Mind Games", Edgar lures him into a trap, but is defeated and arrested by Neo-Gotham authorities.
 Edgar returns in The Zeta Project episode "Ro's Gift", voiced again by John Rhys-Davies. Having escaped from prison by this time, he and fellow Brain Trust member Bombshell continue their operations until they are foiled by Rosalie "Ro" Rowan and the children the Brain Trust had kidnapped at that point and arrested by the authorities once more.
 A young Edgar and his father Steven Mandragora appear in the Justice League Unlimited episode "Double Date", voiced by Brian Tochi and Glenn Shadix respectively. The latter is a crime lord with immense strength and endurance who killed Helena Bertinelli's parents when she was young, which led to her becoming the Huntress and joining the Justice League. After discovering he is in federal custody as an informant, Bertinelli sets out to kill him despite being ousted from the League. Upon reaching him amidst an escape attempt however, she relents due to Edgar and sees Steven put back in federal custody.
 Tobias Whale appears in Beware the Batman, voiced by Michael-Leon Wooley. This version is Gotham's leading crime lord who employs criminals such as his lawyer / enforcer, Phosphorus Rex. In addition, Humphry Dumpler used to work as his accountant before Whale mounted a failed attempt on Dumpler's life, leading to Dumpler seeking revenge.
 Tobias Whale appears in Black Lightning, portrayed by Marvin "Krondon" Jones III. This version received his anti-aging serum from Dr. Helga Jace and is a former politician who rose through the ranks of Freeland's local government through corruption before he was brought down by Black Lightning's father, Alvin Pierce. After killing Alvin, Whale was removed from the government and became the leader of the 100 after receiving ownership from crime boss Lady Eve, with Joey Toledo and Syonide serving as enforcers and Whale's sister Tori (portrayed by Edwina Findley) as support. Over the course of the series, Whale battles Black Lightning alongside different allies until the former is eventually killed in battle against the latter while attempting to throw Black Lightning out of a window.

Film
 Tobias Whale appears in Suicide Squad: Hell to Pay, voiced by Dave Fennoy. This version is a crime lord and underboss in the Black Mask Mob. He battles Task Force X, who were sent by Amanda Waller to recover a flash drive in his possession, until Count Vertigo weakens Whale enough for Punch to force the crime boss to kill himself.
 Tobias Whale appears in Catwoman: Hunted, voiced by Keith David. This version is a member of Leviathan.

References

External links
 Tobias Whale at the DCU Guide

Characters created by Tony Isabella
Comics characters introduced in 1977
DC Comics male supervillains
Fictional African-American people
Fictional characters with albinism
Fictional gangsters
DC Comics metahumans